Big Grassy River 35G is a First Nations reserve on the eastern shore of Lake of the Woods in Ontario. It is one of six parcels of land reserved for the Big Grassy First Nation.

References

Saulteaux reserves in Ontario
Communities in Rainy River District